The 2008 ICC World Cricket League Division Four is a cricket tournament in Dar es Salaam, Tanzania, which took place between 4 and 11 October 2008 as a part of the ICC World Cricket League and qualifying for the 2011 Cricket World Cup.

Teams

The teams of Fiji, Hong Kong, Italy and Tanzania qualified through Division Three in 2007, while Afghanistan and Jersey secured their participation through the Division Five in 2008.
The top two teams in the tournament will be promoted to Division Three in 2009.

Teams relegated from Division Three:

Teams qualified through Division Five:

Squads

Group stage

Points table

Fixtures and results

Final and Playoffs

Final Placings

Statistics

See also

ICC World Cricket League

References

World Cricket League structure

External links
 ICC World Cricket League Division 4 – Official Site

League Division 4 2008
2008 Division Four